Carol Arlene Prescott is a professor in the Department of Psychology at the University of Southern California (USC), where she also holds a joint appointment in the Davis School of Gerontology. Before joining the faculty of USC in 2005, she was an assistant, and later associate, professor in the Department of Psychiatry at Virginia Commonwealth University. Her research focuses on the genetic and environmental contributions to variation in cognition, as well as on identifying causes of substance use disorders.

References

External links
Faculty profile

Living people
American women psychologists
American gerontologists
Johns Hopkins University alumni
University of Virginia alumni
Virginia Commonwealth University faculty
University of Southern California faculty
Psychiatric geneticists
Year of birth missing (living people)
American geneticists
American women geneticists
American women psychiatrists
American psychiatrists
American women academics
21st-century American women